Colias caucasica, the Balkan clouded yellow, is a butterfly in the family Pieridae. It is found in the western Caucasus, in northeastern Turkey, and in the Balkan Peninsula.

Description
Similar to but larger and more deeply orange red than Colias myrmidone, the distal margin being more broadly black; on the underside, which is similar to that of C. myrmidone, the very large central double spot of the hindwing is prominent. The female is mostly yellowish white, rarely orange red, bearing small light submarginal spots.

Biology
The larvae feed on Cytisus and Astragalus caucasicus.

Subspecies 
Colias caucasica caucasica
Colias caucasica balcanica Rebel, 1901 - may be a full species (Colias balcanica)

References

Butterflies described in 1871
caucasica
Butterflies of Europe
Taxa named by Otto Staudinger